William Horschke (September 12, 1879 – January 27, 1956) was an American gymnast. He competed in four events at the 1904 Summer Olympics.

References

External links
 

1879 births
1956 deaths
American male artistic gymnasts
Olympic gymnasts of the United States
Gymnasts at the 1904 Summer Olympics
People from Neu-Isenburg
Sportspeople from Darmstadt (region)
German emigrants to the United States